James Monroe Wells (1837–1918) was an author, Union Army officer, and politician. He wrote The Chisolm Massacre; A picture of "home rule" in Mississippi about the Chisolm Massacre. James Daniel Lynch responded with an account blaming Radical Republicans titled Kemper County Vindicated, And a Peep at Radical Rule in Mississippi. Wells served as a state senator in Idaho.

Lucinda D. Wells and Samuel Percival Wells were his parents. Wells was born in Erie County, New York and moved to Michigan with his family at age two. He grew up on a farm. He studied at Kalamazoo College, and became a teacher. He served in the Union Army as a cavalry officer. He was twice captured. He and others escaped through a tunnel from Libby Prison. He married Delphene Bartholomew in 1866.

He came to Mississippi in 1868 for a Federal revenue position and was a Republican leader in Kemper County, Mississippi. He moved to Idaho in 1884 and served as a state senator in its first legislature. His autobiography titled With Touch of Elbow was published in 1909.

Writings
The Chisholm massacre : a picture of "home rule" in Mississippi.
Tunneling out of Libby Prison : a Michigan lieutenant's account of his own imprisonment and daring escape
With touch of elbow or, death before dishonor : a thrilling narrative of adventure on land and sea by James M Wells; United States. Army. Michigan Cavalry Regiment, 8th (1862–1865)

References

External links

Idaho state senators
People from Erie County, New York
American autobiographers
1837 births
1918 deaths
Kalamazoo College alumni
People of Michigan in the American Civil War
Mississippi Republicans
Idaho Republicans
Schoolteachers from Michigan
People from Kemper County, Mississippi
19th-century American educators
19th-century American male writers
Union Army officers
20th-century American male writers
19th-century American biographers
American escapees
American Civil War prisoners of war
Escapees from Virginia detention
Escapees from United States military detention